Deutonura is a genus of springtails in the family Neanuridae. There are at least 40 described species in Deutonura.

Species
These 44 species belong to the genus Deutonura:

 Deutonura albella (Stach, 1920) g
 Deutonura anophthalma (Massoud & Thibaud, 1968) g
 Deutonura arbeai Lucianez & Simon, 1995 g
 Deutonura atlantica Deharveng, 1982 g
 Deutonura balsainensis Simon Benito, 1978 g
 Deutonura benzi Traser, Thibaud & Najt, 1993 g
 Deutonura betica Deharveng, 1979 g
 Deutonura caerulescens Deharveng, 1982 g
 Deutonura caprai Dallai, 1983 g
 Deutonura carinthiaca Deharveng, 1982 g
 Deutonura centralis (da Gama, 1964) g
 Deutonura coiffaiti Deharveng, 1979 g
 Deutonura conjuncta (Stach, 1926) g
 Deutonura corsica (Denis, 1947) g
 Deutonura czarnohorensis Deharveng, 1982 g
 Deutonura decolorata (da Gama & Gisin, 1964) g
 Deutonura deficiens Deharveng, 1979 g
 Deutonura deharvengi Arbea & Jordana, 1991 g
 Deutonura dextra Gisin, 1954 g
 Deutonura gibbosa Porco, Bedos & Deharveng, 2010 g
 Deutonura gisini Deharveng, 1982 g
 Deutonura ibicensis (Ellis, 1974) g
 Deutonura igilica Dallai, 1983 g
 Deutonura ilvatica Dallai, 1983 g
 Deutonura inopinata Deharveng, 1979 g
 Deutonura insularis Deharveng, 1982 g
 Deutonura jeromoltoi Deharveng, Bedos & Duran, 2015 g
 Deutonura luberonensis Deharveng, 1982 g
 Deutonura mirabilis Deharveng, 1987 g
 Deutonura monticola (Cassagnau, 1954) g
 Deutonura oglasicola Dallai, 1983 g
 Deutonura phlegraea (Caroli, 1912) g
 Deutonura plena (Stach, 1951) g
 Deutonura provincialis Deharveng, 1979 g
 Deutonura quinquesetosa Deharveng, 1982 g
 Deutonura selgae Deharveng, 1979 g
 Deutonura similis Deharveng, 1979 g
 Deutonura sinistra (Denis, 1935) g
 Deutonura stachi (Gisin, 1952) g
 Deutonura sylviae Dallai, 1983 g
 Deutonura urbionensis Deharveng, 1979 g
 Deutonura vallespirensis Deharveng, 1982 g
 Deutonura weinerae Deharveng, 1982 g
 Deutonura zana g

Data sources: i = ITIS, c = Catalogue of Life, g = GBIF, b = Bugguide.net

References

Further reading

 
 
 

Springtail genera